The Fourteenth Ward Industrial School is located at 256-258 Mott Street between Prince and Houston Streets in the Nolita neighborhood of Manhattan, New York City.  It was built for the Children's Aid Society in 1888–89, with funds provided by John Jacob Astor III, and was designed by the firm of Vaux & Radford in the Victorian Gothic style. The Society built a number of schools for indigent children at the time. It was later known as the Astor Memorial School.

The building, which is now in residential use, was designated a New York City landmark in 1977, and was added to the National Register of Historic Places in 1983.

See also
National Register of Historic Places listings in Manhattan below 14th Street

References

Notes

School buildings on the National Register of Historic Places in Manhattan
Gothic Revival architecture in New York City
School buildings completed in 1889
New York City Designated Landmarks in Manhattan

Calvert Vaux designs
Nolita